Nixon Aníbal Carcelén Chalá (born September 27, 1969) is a former Ecuadorian international footballer who played 40 times for the Ecuador national team between 1991 and 1999

Carcelén spent the majority of his club career with the two main teams from Quito, LDU Quito and Deportivo Quito, he also played for Barcelona Sporting Club and Deportivo Cuenca towards the end of his career.

Honors

Club
LDU Quito
 Serie A: 1998, 1999, 2003

Nation
 
 Korea Cup: 1995

References

External links

1969 births
Living people
Ecuadorian footballers
Ecuador international footballers
1991 Copa América players
1993 Copa América players
1995 Copa América players
S.D. Quito footballers
Barcelona S.C. footballers
L.D.U. Quito footballers
C.D. Cuenca footballers
Association football midfielders